At least three ships of the Royal Navy have been named HMS Candytuft :

  was an  launched in May 1917 and torpedoed and stranded in November 1917.
  was a  launched in July 1940. She was transferred to the United States Navy in March 1942 as USS Tenacity
  was a Modified Flower-class corvette launched in September 1943, but which served as HMCS Long Branch (K487) with the Royal Canadian Navy from January 1944 to June 1945.

Royal Navy ship names